Beil may refer to:

 Beil (surname)
 Großer Beil, mountain in Austria
 A former spelling of Biel, East Lothian